Acacia curvata is a shrub of the genus Acacia and the subgenus Plurinerves that is endemic to an area in south western Australia.

Description
It has densely haired branchlets with persistent thin and dry stipules. Like most species of Acacia it has phyllodes rather than true leaves, The glabrous, rigid and pungent evergreen phyllodes are crowded along the branchlets. It blooms from May to July and produces yellow flowers.

Taxonomy
The species was first formally described by the botanist Bruce Maslin in 1977 as part of the work Studies in the genus Acacia (Mimosaceae) as published in the journal Nuytsia. It was reclassified as Racosperma curvatum by Leslie Pedley in 2003 then transferred back to genus Acacia in 2006.

Distribution
It is native to an area in the Goldfields-Esperance region of Western Australia where it is commonly found growing in clay loam soils often containing lateritic gravel. The range of the species is from around Ravensthorpe in the west to around Kundip in the south and out to Munglinup in the east and also Scaddan–Wittenoom Hills area as a part of open scrubland communities.

See also
 List of Acacia species

References

curvata
Acacias of Western Australia
Taxa named by Bruce Maslin
Plants described in 1977